Mount Danforth is an ice-free, pyramidal mountain over  high, standing immediately east of Mount Zanuck on the south side of Albanus Glacier, in the Queen Maud Mountains. It was discovered in December 1934 by the Byrd Antarctic Expedition geological party under Quin Blackburn, and named by Richard E. Byrd for William H. Danforth of the Purina Mills, St. Louis, a contributor to the expedition.

References
 

Mountains of the Ross Dependency
Gould Coast